Otar Dadunashvili (21 March 1928 – 28 August 1992) was a Georgian-Soviet cyclist. He competed in the men's sprint event at the 1952 Summer Olympics.

References

1928 births
1992 deaths
Soviet male cyclists
Olympic cyclists of the Soviet Union
Cyclists at the 1952 Summer Olympics
Male cyclists from Georgia (country)